Holstre is a village in Viljandi Parish, Viljandi County, Estonia. It has a population of about 220.

Holstre is the birthplace of Estonian composer Juhan Aavik (1884-1982).

References

Villages in Viljandi County
Kreis Fellin